Cerithiella martensii is a species of very small sea snail, a marine gastropod mollusk in the family Newtoniellidae. This species is known from the Gulf of Mexico. It was described by Dall, in 1889.

Description 
The maximum recorded shell length is 11.3 mm.

Habitat 
Minimum recorded depth is 419 m. Maximum recorded depth is 2160 m.

References

Newtoniellidae
Gastropods described in 1889